Herbert Workman may refer to:

Herbert Brook Workman (1862–1951), Methodist
Charles H. Workman (Charles Herbert Workman, 1873–1923), Edwardian singer, actor and comedian